All Is Possible in Granada is a 1954 Spanish comedy film directed by José Luis Sáenz de Heredia and starring Merle Oberon, Francisco Rabal and Rafael Bardem. It was entered into the 1954 Cannes Film Festival. In 1982 it was remade under the same title. The film's sets were designed by the art director Ramiro Gómez.

Plot 
Following a prologue in the early 19th century concerning the finding of a hoard belonging to Boabdil, the fiction moves forward to 1950s Granada, involving the arrival of an American mining company to the city and the expropriation of land plots in the surroundings in order to extract uranium.

Cast

References

Bibliography
 Mira, Alberto. The A to Z of Spanish Cinema. Rowman & Littlefield, 2010.

External links

1954 films
1950s Spanish-language films
Spanish black-and-white films
Films directed by José Luis Sáenz de Heredia
1950s fantasy comedy films
Spanish fantasy comedy films
1954 comedy films
Films set in Granada
Films set in the 1950s
1950s Spanish films